Forenville  is a former commune in the Nord department in northern France, merged in 1964 with Séranvillers to create Séranvillers-Forenville

Heraldry

See also
Communes of the Nord department

Former communes of Nord (French department)